Daybreak Zero is the title of a science fiction novel by John Barnes. It is the second of three books comprising the Daybreak series.

Plot
In the near future, a variety of groups with diverse aims, but an overlapping desire to end modern technological society (the "Big System") create a nanotech plague ("Daybreak") which both destroys rubber and plastics and eats away any metal conductors carrying electricity.  An open question in the book is whether these groups, and their shared motivation, are coordinated by some conscious actor, or whether they are an emergent property / meme that attained a critical mass.

External links

2011 American novels
American science fiction novels
Novels by John Barnes

Ace Books books